The Archdiocese of Miami is a particular church of the Catholic Church in the United States of America. Its ecclesiastical territory consists of Broward, Miami-Dade and Monroe counties in the U.S. state of Florida. The archdiocese is the metropolitan see for the Ecclesiastical Province of Miami, which covers Florida. The archbishop is Thomas Wenski. As archbishop, he also serves as pastor of the Cathedral of Saint Mary, the mother church of the archdiocese. Also serving are 258 priests, 133 permanent deacons, 41 religious brothers and 204 religious sisters who are members of various religious institutes. These priests, deacons and persons religious serve a Catholic population in South Florida of 475,774 in 109 parishes and missions.

Because of the vast number of immigrants, Mass is offered in at least a dozen languages in parishes throughout the archdiocese. Educational institutions consist of two schools for the disabled, 60 elementary/middle schools, 13 high schools, two universities, and two seminaries. Radio, print, and television media outlets owned and operated by the archdiocese supplement teaching, communication, and ministries.

Several social service organizations are operated by the archdiocese which include two hospitals, nine health care centers, three homes for the aged, and two cemeteries. Charities include homeless shelters, legal services for the poor, an HIV/AIDS ministry, and the Missionaries of Charity and Society of Saint Vincent de Paul ministries to the poor. Catholic Charities of the Archdiocese of Miami is a separate non-profit organization operated by the archdiocese. It claims to be the largest non-governmental provider of social services to the needy in South Florida.

History 
Before 1952, the entire State of Florida was under the jurisdiction of one diocese, the Roman Catholic Diocese of Saint Augustine. In the 1950s and early 1960s, Saint Augustine bishop Joseph Patrick Hurley purchased land throughout South Florida in anticipation of a future population boom. Today, these once remote areas are thriving cities. Dozens of Catholic churches, schools and cemeteries built on the land purchased by Hurley dot these areas.

The Diocese of Miami was created on October 7, 1958, with Coleman Carroll installed as bishop. The diocese included the 16 southern counties in Florida, with a Catholic population of 200,000. It encompassed one half of the area of the state. Less than a year after the creation of the diocese, Fidel Castro came to power in Cuba. This set off a mass exodus of Cuban exiles to South Florida, increasing church membership in the region. The Catholic Welfare Bureau, created by Carroll, played a significant part in helping these waves of Cuban immigrants. Between 1960 and 1962, 14,000 Cuban children were sent to the United States. Operation Pedro Pan, created by Monsignor Bryan O. Walsh, placed them with friends, relatives or the Catholic Welfare Bureau. In 1996, the Catholic Welfare Bureau changed its name to Catholic Charities. Today it claims to be the largest non-governmental provider of social services in South Florida. It served over 17,000 families in the tri-county area of Broward, Dade and Monroe counties in 2006.

Due to an increased population, the diocese was divided in 1968. Eight counties became part of the Diocese of St. Petersburg and the new Diocese of Orlando. Miami was made an archdiocese by Pope Paul VI, and was named Metropolitan See for all of Florida. Carroll became an archbishop on March 2, 1968. He participated in the church reforms of Vatican II as one of the Council Fathers. During the civil rights struggles of the 60's, Carroll was influential in stemming threatened racial riots in Miami and in desegregating Catholic schools roughly 10 years before the rest of the State. He became a founder of the Community Relations Board which worked to "quell waves of misunderstanding, discrimination and discontent which often threatened to flood South Florida's multi-ethnic community."

Upon the death of Carroll on July 26, 1977, Bishop Edward Anthony McCarthy was appointed as Miami's archbishop. McCarthy oversaw the construction of the Pastoral Center for the archdiocese and restructured most senior operational divisions. He established the Office of Lay Ecclesial Ministry, the Office of Evangelization and the Permanent Diaconate program. In 1980, he offered support and assistance during the Mariel Boat Lift. The following year, he supported the rights of Haitian immigrants who were detained under the Wet Foot, Dry Foot policy. Responding to the needs of this new immigration, he opened the Pierre Toussaint Haitian Catholic Center. McCarthy retired in 1994 at the required age of 75.

On November 3, 1994, Pope John Paul II appointed John C. Favalora as the third archbishop of Miami. During his tenure, he built two new high schools and nine grade schools. Favalora also initiated the Vision 2000 campaign, a five-year fundraising campaign that created an endowment fund to support Catholic education and outreach institutions in the archdiocese. The effort raised $90 million. On July 11, 2003, Pope John Paul II appointed Miami auxiliary bishop Thomas Gerard Wenski to lead the Roman Catholic Diocese of Orlando. With substantial immigration of predominantly Catholic South and Central Americans to the South Florida area, the Catholic population there is 25% of the total population. Waves of immigrants from other parts of the world, including Asian and African countries, have led to Mass being celebrated in over a dozen different languages in parishes throughout the archdiocese.

In 2009, Father Fernando Isern, of Our Lady of Lourdes, Kendall, was named the next bishop of Pueblo. He is the 11th priest from the archdiocese to be so designated since its creation in 1958.

On April 20, 2010, Pope Benedict XVI accepted the resignation of Archbishop John Favalora eight months early and appointed Bishop Thomas Wenski of the Roman Catholic Diocese of Orlando as his successor. On June 1, 2010, Archbishop Wenski was installed as the fourth archbishop of the Archdiocese of Miami at the Cathedral of Saint Mary.

On March 15, 2019, Homestead priest Jean Claude Jean-Philippe was arrested on charges of drugging and raping a female parishioner who he invited to his home the previous October.

Bishops

Archbishops of Miami
 Coleman Carroll (1958–1977), elevated to Archbishop in 1968
 Edward Anthony McCarthy (1977–1994)
 John Favalora (1994–2010)
 Thomas Wenski (2010–present)

Auxiliary Bishops
 René Gracida (1968–1975), appointed Bishop of Pensacola-Tallahassee and later Bishop of Corpus Christi
 John Nevins (1979–1984), appointed Bishop of Venice
 Agustin Roman (1979–2013)
 Norbert Dorsey (1986–1990), appointed Bishop of Orlando
 Gilberto Fernandez (1997–2002)
 Thomas Wenski (1997–2003), appointed Coadjutor Bishop and later Bishop of Orlando and Archbishop of Miami
 Felipe Estévez (2004–2011), appointed Bishop of Saint Augustine
 John Noonan (2005–2010), appointed Bishop of Orlando
 John Fitzpatrick (1968–1971), appointed Bishop of Brownsville
 Peter Baldacchino (2014–2019), appointed Bishop of Las Cruces
 Enrique Esteban Delgado (2017–present)

Other priests of the diocese who became bishops
Ambrose De Paoli, appointed Apostolic Nuncio and Titular Archbishop in 1983
Fernando Isern, appointed Bishop of Pueblo in 2009
Robert Nugent Lynch, appointed Bishop of Saint Petersburg in 1995

Education

Schools 
As of 2008, the Archdiocese of Miami provides a parochial school education to almost 40,000 students in 60 elementary/middle schools, 13 high schools and two non-residential schools for the disabled located throughout Broward, Miami-Dade and Monroe counties.

The high schools supported by the archdiocese are:

The archdiocese offers religious education classes in all of its 111 parishes for children who attend public and other non-religious schools. According to the 2007 Official Catholic Directory, there were 95,837 students enrolled in these classes. This same source lists as teachers 2760 laity, 58 religious sisters, and 43 priests and religious brothers. Religious education classes are also offered to adults throughout the archdiocese. In 1997, Archbishop Favalora adopted a policy requiring all volunteers, employees, teachers and priests to be fingerprinted and have a background check before they could work with children. Several years later, this policy was enshrined and adopted by all U.S. Bishops in the Charter for Protection of Young People.

Universities 

The Archdiocese of Miami oversees and administers the Catholic university of  St. Thomas University in Miami.  St. Thomas University offers Bachelor of Arts, Master of Arts, Master's degree, Master of Business Administration, M.Acc., Doctor of Education, and Doctor of Philosophy programs through its college and various schools. It offers several joint degree programs and an accelerated B.A./J.D. as well. The School of Law at St. Thomas was fully accredited by the American Bar Association in February 1995, and offers the Juris Doctor degree (J.D.) as well as the Masters of Law (LL.M).

Seminaries 

St. John Vianney College Seminary and St. Vincent de Paul Regional Seminary serve priestly formation needs. Candidates to the Catholic priesthood must have a college degree plus another four to five years of seminary formation. This formation includes not only academic classes but also human, spiritual and pastoral education. St. John Vianney Seminary, which is located in Miami, states as its fundamental purpose "to provide an undergraduate education for students whose stated objective is to serve the Catholic Church as priests", but it also offers education to lay ministers and to "others who may be enriched by its services". St. Vincent de Paul Regional Seminary, located in Boynton Beach, offers a master's degree in Theology and Theological Studies and a First Professional Degree in Divinity and Ministry. Priests serving in the Archdiocese of Miami are required to speak both Spanish and English, and these two seminaries are the only bilingual seminaries in the United States. As of August 2007, there are 126 seminarians in priestly formation at both seminaries.

On Thursday, December 15, 2011 The Redemptoris Mater Seminary of the Archdiocese of Miami was erected, with the signing of the decree and the canonical and civil documents. Located in Hialeah, Florida, is a Diocesan seminary where the seminarians once ordained, will be at the disposal of the Archbishop for internal or missionary assignments. Currently, there are 20 seminarians, all studying for the Archdiocese of Miami, who follow classes either in St. John Vianney College Seminary or St. Vincent de Paul Regional Seminary

Catholic Charities of the Archdiocese of Miami 

Catholic Charities of the Archdiocese of Miami is a separate non-profit organization operated by the Archdiocese of Miami. It is part of a national network of organizations that are operated in each U.S. diocese. This organization claims to be the largest nongovernmental provider of services to the needy in South Florida. It began in 1931 during the Great Depression with four Miami-area pastors and lay members of the Society of Saint Vincent de Paul. It employs over 600 staff and operates on an annual budget of over $38 million. In 2006, it served over 17,000 families in the tri-county area of Broward, Miami-Dade and Monroe Counties. Some of these services include transitional housing, homeless shelters, elderly day care, child day care, addiction recovery, HIV/AIDS programs, family and school counseling, meals for the elderly and various immigrant and refugee help programs among others.

Catholic Health Services 

Archdiocese of Miami Catholic Health Services operates 26 facilities in Broward and Miami-Dade Counties. According to the 2007 Archdiocese of Miami Official Catholic Directory, the two Catholic hospitals, Mercy Hospital in Miami and Holy Cross Hospital in Ft. Lauderdale, served 1,278,516 people; three CHS health care centers served 7,896; three homes for the aged assisted 2,578 senior citizens; two residential care centers for children served 376; seven day-care centers served 1,885; two specialized homes assisted 383; twelve special centers for social services served 81,320; and eleven other institutions served 1,432 people in 2007. Catholic Hospice Care is a partnership between the Archdiocese of Miami and Mercy Hospital. It provides end of life care to terminally ill patients and their families throughout Miami-Dade and Monroe counties. Catholic Health Services also operates two Catholic cemeteries, Our Lady Queen of Heaven in Broward County and Our Lady of Mercy in Miami-Dade.

Outreach

Lay movements and ministries 
Over 60 movements and ministries are run by laity (those who are not ordained priests or religious brothers and sisters), "There may be hundreds more ..." according to Miami auxiliary bishop Felipe Estevez. There are 17 categories of ministries listed under the archdiocese Office of Lay Apostolate are: Airport Ministry, Apostleship of the Sea, Ascending Life, Campus ministry, Charismatic Renewal, Courage Ministry ("Ministry to Persons With Same-Sex Attraction"), Council of Catholic Women, Cursillo, Family Life, Knights of Columbus, Lay ministry, Lay movements, Marian movements, Missions, Prison ministry, Respect Life, and Youth Ministries. Some other lay movements and ministries include various prayer and support groups, an Emmaus, and groups which provide worship, social and religious formation for men, women and teenagers. Some parishes provide groups for single Catholics, divorced or separated people, drug and alcohol addiction help, learning Spanish or English as a second language and parish outreach services to the poor and needy through parish pantries and need-specific donor drives.

The archdiocese also supports, in conjunction with other Christian communities, two anti-abortion crisis pregnancy centers which provide aid to pregnant women and encourage them not to have abortions. A post-abortion counseling program called Project Rachel is also provided.

Retreats 

Morning Star Renewal Center is a retreat house operated by lay people with the support of the archdiocese. The center provides facilities for group retreats and offers spiritual formation activities year round. Facilities include a 60 guest capacity, a conference room, a chapel, and overnight and cafeteria accommodations.

Charities 
Several Charities are run by the archdiocese and staffed by both employees and volunteers. These include Camillus House, Catholic Legal Services, an HIV/AIDS shelter, the Missionaries of Charity, Society of Saint Vincent de Paul, and social advocacy groups.

Media 
The archdiocese uses several types of media to fulfill its evangelization efforts:

Radio ministry 
Radio Paz is a Spanish-language radio ministry of the Archdiocese of Miami founded in December 1990. In South Florida, it is broadcast on WACC 830 AM. Radio Peace—the sister station of Radio Paz—is an English-language radio ministry founded in January 1993 and broadcast on WLVJ 1040 AM. These stations also broadcast over the Internet at RadioPeace.org. The stations were founded by Archdiocese of Miami priest Fr. Federico Capdepon, who envisioned a radio station "to respond to the call of Pope John Paul II to evangelize through the media."

Newspaper 

A localized version of the Florida Catholic newspaper is published 26 times a year. Each issue contains a message from the Archbishop, spiritual reflections on the scripture readings for the week, news reporting on various events happening around the archdiocese and the world, and a digest of upcoming events featured around the archdiocese among other features. The newspaper is also published online. A series produced for the Miami edition entitled "Building the City of God" which profiles the personal side of priests won a Communicator Award of Distinction for print media "Marketing/Promotion/Campaign".

Television 
One part of Communications office of the archdiocese is television and video production. English and Spanish masses air Sundays on local television stations. Additionally, the television center produces content for the internet and video. One video, entitled "Walking in the Light of Christ," received a Videographer Award of Excellence from the Association of Marketing and Communication Professionals.

See also 

 Catholic Church by country
 Catholic Church hierarchy
 History of Miami
 List of the Catholic dioceses of the United States
 List of churches in the Roman Catholic Archdiocese of Miami
 Pedro Menéndez de Avilés
 Sexual abuse scandal in Miami archdiocese
 Timeline of Miami, Florida history

References

External links 

 Roman Catholic Archdiocese of Miami Official Site
 
 
 
 Catholic Charities of the Archdiocese of Miami
 The Florida Catholic Newspaper
 Catholic Health Services
 Catholic Hospice Care
 St. John Vianney Seminary, Miami
 St. Vincent De Paul Regional Seminary, Boynton Beach

 
Christianity in Miami
Broward County, Florida
Monroe County, Florida
Miami
Miami
Miami
1958 establishments in Florida